Danny Patrick (born 25 April 1978) is a film director and screenwriter. He began his career in writing for television and in 2000 directed his first feature film, Malicious Intent, which became a cult film. He followed up with the acclaimed comedy gangster film Moussaka & Chips in 2006 and The Best Years in 2012.  Then followed a brief hiatus before Requiem for a Fighter in 2018 and The Maltese Connection in 2021.  His current film Pulcinella is due for release in 2022

Background
Danny was first inspired to become a film director when he saw Stanley Kubrick's The Shining (1980) on home video at the age of eleven. He began making home movies using video equipment and in 1989 he attended film school Strand Road University. In the next ten years, he wrote and developed television programmes with his flatmate Elliot Wilson. Patrick continued to write and develop his own projects, directing his first film in 2000, Malicious Intent.

Filmography
2000 Malicious Intent – Writer, Director, Editor
2003 Hey Mr DJ – Director, Writer
2006 Moussaka & Chips – Co-Writer with Emily Corcoran, Director
2012 The Best Years – Director, Writer
2018 Requiem for a Fighter – Director, Co-Writer with Jason Gerard
2020 The Maltese Connection – Character with Emily Corcoran, Writer, Director
2022 Pulcinella – Writer, Director, Producer
2020 Ayran Papers – Writer, Director, Producer

References

External links

British film directors
Living people
1972 births